Vizsoly is a village in Borsod-Abaúj-Zemplén county, Hungary.

Sights to see
A copy of the Károli Bible, the first complete Hungarian translation of the Bible is exhibited in the Reformed church of the village.

The church was built in the 13th century. In the 14th century it was expanded and decorated with murals, one of which depicts a well-known legend about King Saint Ladislaus saving a girl from a Cumanian warrior who kidnapped her. There are about 50 churches in Hungary where paintings inspired by this event exist.

References
 Gerő, L. (1984): Magyar műemléki ABC. (Hungarian Architectural Heritage ABC.) Budapest
 Henszlmann, I. (1876): Magyarország ó-keresztyén, román és átmeneti stylü mű-emlékeinek rövid ismertetése, (Old-Christian, Romanesque and Transitional Style Architecture in Hungary). Királyi Magyar Egyetemi Nyomda, Budapest
 Gerevich T. (1938): Magyarország románkori emlékei. (Die romanische Denkmäler Ungarns.) Egyetemi nyomda. Budapest 
 Dercsényi D. (1972): Románkori építészet Magyarországon. Corvina, Budapest
 László Gyula (1993): A Szent László-legenda középkori falképei. Tájak-Korok-Múzeumok Könyvtára 4. szám, Budapest

External links 
 Street map 

Populated places in Borsod-Abaúj-Zemplén County
Romanesque architecture in Hungary